Alfred Bammesberger (born 25 September 1938 in Munich) is Professor Emeritus of English and Comparative Linguistics at the Catholic University of Eichstätt.

Scientific career 
State examination in English and French 1962–1965, Dr. phil. (Munich 1965), Habilitation (Freiburg 1970). Professor of English and Comparative Linguistics, Catholic University of Eichstätt from 1980, emeritus 2006. Rejected appointments: Münster (1979), Würzburg (1988), Freiburg (1989).

Bammesberger is the author of more than 25 scholarly books and numerous essays on historical linguistics, with a focus on Indo-Germanic studies, Old German studies, English studies, and Baltic studies. From 1985 to 2015, Alfred Bammesberger was editor of the journal Historische Sprachforschung/Historical Linguistics and he is still co-editor of the journal Onomasiology Online (2022). He is an external member of the Polish Academy of Arts and Sciences in Krakow.

Works (selection) 
 Deverbative jan-Verba des Altenglischen - München, 1965
 Abstraktbildungen in den baltischen Sprachen (= Zeitschrift für vergleichende Sprachforschung auf dem Gebiet der indogermanischen Sprachen. Ergänzungshefte. 22). Vandenhoeck & Ruprecht, Göttingen 1973, ISBN 3-525-26208-6 (Simultaneously abridged: Freiburg, university, Habilitations-Schrift, 1971).
 Beiträge zu einem etymologischen Wörterbuch des Altenglischen [Contributions to an etymological Dictionary of the Old English language] - Heidelberg : Winter, 1979
 Englische Sprachwissenschaft English Linguistics- München : Minerva-Publikation, 1981
 An outline of modern Irish grammar - Heidelberg : Winter, 1983
 Twentieth century Irish prose - Heidelberg : Winter, 1984
 A sketch of diachronic English morphology - Regensburg: Pustet, 1984
 Studien zur Laryngaltheorie [Studies on Laryngeal Theory] - Göttingen : Vandenhoeck und Ruprecht, 1984
 Lateinische Sprachwissenschaft Latin Linguistics - Regensburg : Pustet, 1984
 As editor: The etymological dictionary. Questions of conception and design. Friedrich Pustet, Regensburg 1983.
 English etymology. Carl Winter, Heidelberg 1984.
 Problems of old English lexicography - Regensburg: Pustet, 1985
 Linguistic notes on Old English poetic texts - Heidelberg: Winter, 1986
 Der Aufbau des germanischen Verbalsystems - Heidelberg: Winter, 1986
 English linguistics - Heidelberg : Winter, 1989
 Britain 400-600 - Heidelberg: Winter, 1990
 As editor with Gaby Waxenberger: Pforzen und Bergakker. New investigations on runic inscriptions (= Historische Sprachforschung. Ergänzungsheft. 41). Vandenhoeck & Ruprecht, Göttingen 1990, ISBN 3-525-26231-0, (digital copy).
 Old English runes and their continental background - Heidelberg: Winter, 1991
 Akten des VIII. Internationalen Kolloquiums zur Lateinischen Linguistik / International Colloquium on Latin Linguistics (1995: Eichstätt). - Heidelberg: Winter, 1996
 Index to the Journal of Comparative Linguistics, Volumes 1-100 (1851-1987). Vandenhoeck & Ruprecht, Göttingen 1997.
 As editor: Baltic Studies. Tasks and Methods (= Indo-European Library. Dept. 3: Investigations. 19). Winter, Heidelberg 1998, ISBN 3-8253-0726-3.
 Baltistik - Heidelberg: Winter, 1998
 Repetitorium zur englischen Sprachwissenschaft - Heidelberg : Winter, 1999 
 Languages in prehistoric Europe - Heidelberg: Winter, 2003
 Das fuþark und seine einzelsprachlichen Weiterentwicklungen - Berlin/Boston: De Gruyter, 2006 (online ressource)

Literature about A. Bammesberger 
 Bammesberger, Alfred. In: Wilfried Kürschner (ed.): Linguisten-Handbuch. 2 vols. Narr, Tübingen 1994, ISBN 3-8233-5000-5, vol. 1, p. 31 f. (online).

External links 
 Literature by and about Alfred Bammesberger in the Catalog of the German National Library
 Alfred Bammesberger on the website of the KU Eichstätt-Ingolstadt
 Alfred Bammesberger as Co-Editor of Onomasiology Online
 Editorial of Historische Sprachforschung vol. 128 (2015) on the occasion of Bammesbergers retirement after 30 years as editor [in German].
 Alfred Bammesberger on the website of Göttingen Academy of Sciences and Humanities.

21st-century linguists
Linguists from Germany
Linguists of Indo-European languages
Linguists of Germanic languages
Linguists of English
Historical linguists of English
Runologists
People from Munich
Living people
1938 births